Mahmudabad-e Kohneh (also Romanized as Maḩmūdābād-e Kohneh) is a village in Jalilabad Rural District, Jalilabad District, Pishva County, Tehran Province, Iran. At the 2006 census, its population was 104, in 23 families.

References 

Populated places in Pishva County